McGrattan is a surname. Notable people with the surname include:

Brian McGrattan (rugby union) (born 1959), New Zealand rugby union player
Brian McGrattan (born 1981), Canadian ice hockey player
Gerard McGrattan (born 1972), Northern Ireland hurler
Johnny McGrattan (born 1977), Northern Ireland hurler
Tom McGrattan (born 1927), Canadian ice hockey player
William McGrattan (born 1956), Canadian Catholic bishop